The Colpurini are a tribe of leaf-footed bugs, in the subfamily Coreinae erected (as a subfamily) by Gustav Breddin in 1900.  Genera are distributed from India, South-East Asia through to Australia and New Zealand. The tribe name (type) is based on Colpura Bergroth: now a subgenus of Hygia.

Genera
The Coreoidea Species File lists:
 Acantholybas Breddin, 1899
 Acanthotyla Stål, 1873
 Acarihygia Brailovsky, 1993
 Agathyrna Stål, 1861
 Ashlockhygia Brailovsky & Ortega Leon, 1994
 Astacops Boisduval, 1835
 Ballhygia Brailovsky & Ortega Leon, 1994
 Baumannhygia Brailovsky, 1996
 Brachylybas Stål, 1871
 Brachylybastella Brailovsky, 1995
 Buruhygia Brailovsky, 1993
 Calyptohygia Brailovsky, 1998
 Carayonhygia Brailovsky, 2002
 Carvalhygia Brailovsky, 1995
 Cephalohygia Brailovsky, 2004
 Eludohygia Brailovsky, 1996
 Grosshygia Brailovsky, 1993
 Grosshygioides Brailovsky, 1993
 Halohygia Brailovsky & Barrera, 2004
 Heisshygia Brailovsky, 1993
 Heydonhygia Brailovsky & Barrera, 2005
 Homalocolpura Breddin, 1900
 Hygia Uhler, 1861
 Kekihygia Brailovsky, 1994
 Kerzhnerhygia Brailovsky, 1993
 Kinabaluhygia Brailovsky, 1996
 Lobogonius Stål, 1871
 Lothygia Brailovsky, 1994
 Lygaeopharus Stål, 1871
 Missimhygia Brailovsky, 1993
 Monasavuhygia Brailovsky, 1996
 Neohalohygia Brailovsky & Barrera, 2004
 Neosciophyrus Brailovsky, 2003
 Nepiohygia Brailovsky, 2003
 Nishihygia Brailovsky, 2000
 Pachycolpura Breddin, 1900
 Pachycolpuroides Brailovsky, 1993
 Panstronhygia Brailovsky & Barrera, 2000
 Riedelhygia Brailovsky & Barrera, 2005
 Salgohygia Brailovsky & Barrera, 2004
 Schaeferhygia Brailovsky & Ortega Leon, 1994
 Sciophyrella Brailovsky & Barrera, 1996
 Sciophyritides Brailovsky & Barrera, 1996
 Sciophyroides Brailovsky & Barrera, 1996
 Sciophyropsis Brailovsky & Barrera, 1996
 Sciophyrus Stål, 1873
 Scioriedeli Brailovsky, 2004
 Sibuyanhygia Brailovsky, 1997
 Sohnhygia Brailovsky, 2003
 Sulawsihygia Brailovsky, 2000
 Tachycolpura Breddin, 1900
 Typhlocolpura Breddin, 1900
 Ullrihygia Brailovsky & Barrera, 2003
 Vittorius Distant, 1902
 Warishygia Brailovsky, 2003
 Weirhygia Brailovsky, 2001
 Wolfius Distant, 1902
 Woodwardhygia Brailovsky, 1993
 Wygohygia Brailovsky, 1993
 Xanthocolpura Breddin, 1900
 Yasunahygia Brailovsky, 2003

References

External links
 

Hemiptera tribes
Coreinae